Rashtriya Chemicals & Fertilisers Company Ground is a multi purpose stadium in Mumbai, Maharashtra. The ground is mainly used for organizing matches of football, cricket and other sports. The stadium has hosted two Ranji Trophy matches  first in 1986 when Bombay cricket team played against Baroda cricket team and again in 1995 when Bombay cricket team played against Baroda cricket team.

The stadium has hosted a List A matches  in 1995 when Bombay cricket team played against Baroda cricket team but since then the stadium has hosted non-first-class matches.

References

External links 
 Cricketarchive
 Cricinfo

Sports venues in Mumbai
Cricket in Mumbai
Sport in Mumbai
Cricket grounds in Maharashtra
Defunct cricket grounds in India
1986 establishments in Maharashtra